Sheikh Mawlawi Abdul Malik (شیخ مولوي عبدالمالک) is an Afghan Taliban leader and Islamic scholar. He is currently serving as Deputy Chief Justice of the Supreme Court of the Islamic Emirate of Afghanistan alongside Mohammad Qasim Rasikh since 28 October 2021.

References

Year of birth missing (living people)
Living people
Afghan judges
Sharia judges
Afghan Islamists
Supreme Court Justices of Afghanistan